Kendall Allen (born 2 June 1992) is a Montserratian international footballer who plays as a defender.

Career
Allen made his international debut for Montserrat on 15 June 2011, in a FIFA World Cup qualifier. He has three caps to date, all coming in FIFA World Cup qualifying matches.

References

1992 births
Living people
Montserratian footballers
Montserrat international footballers

Association football defenders